Peace Party may refer to:

Political parties
 Australian Peace Party, a political party in Australia
 Democratic Peace Party, a political party in Egypt
 Lebanese Peace Party, a political party in Lebanon
 Nationalist Peace Party, a political party in Northern Cyprus
 Peace and Freedom Party, a political party in the United States
 Freedom and Peace Party, a defunct schism of the above party led by Dick Gregory
 Peace and Progress Party, a political party in the United Kingdom
 Peace Party (Turkey), an Alevi political party founded in 1996
 Peace Party, an English political faction during the Civil War; see Eleven Members
 Peace Party (UK), a political party in the United Kingdom
 Peace Politics People's Party, a defunct political party in Denmark 
 Prosperous Peace Party, a political party in Indonesia
 Peace Party of India, a political party in India
 Hungarian Communist Party, a political party in Hungary 
 Party for Democracy and Peace

Other uses
 Woman's Peace Party, the forerunner of the Women's International League for Peace and Freedom
 World Peace Party, a warehouse rave in South Africa held on 13 September 1990